Courtenay Melville Crickmer (1879-1971) was an English architect who was closely associated with the development of Letchworth Garden City and Hampstead Garden Suburb. He was born at St Pancras, London, and educated at Highgate School. He designed many  buildings at Letchworth and around 70 houses at Hampstead Garden Suburb. He was site architect at Gretna, Dumfries.

References 

Architects from London
1879 births
1971 deaths
Hampstead Garden Suburb
Letchworth
People from St Pancras, London
People educated at Highgate School